Leptospermum inelegans is a species of straggly shrub that is endemic to Western Australia. It has only partly hairy young stems, egg-shaped to narrow elliptical leaves on a short petiole, relatively small white or pink flowers and fruit that fall from the plant when mature.

Description

Taxonomy and naming
Leptospermum inelegans was first formally described in 1989 by Joy Thompson in the journal Telopea from specimens collected by Roger Hnatiuk. The specific epithet (inelegans) is a Latin word meaning "not choice" or "tasteless", referring to the usual habit of this species.

Distribution and habitat
This tea-tree is usually found in scrub or heath on hills and undulating plains and occurs in parts of the Coolgardie, Esperance Plains and Mallee biogeographic regions.

Conservation status
Leptospermum inelegans is classified as "not threatened" by the Western Australian Government Department of Parks and Wildlife.

References

inelegans
Flora of Western Australia
Plants described in 1989
Taxa named by Joy Thompson